Julodimorpha bakewelli is a species of beetle in the family Buprestidae. It was first described by Adam White in 1859.

Description
These large brown buprestids have an elongate and almost cylindrical body. The head is almost hidden when the beetle is viewed from above. The pronotum is dark brown and quite wide at the base. The elytra are brown, wider than the pronotum and densely striatopunctated.

Adults are diurnal and herbivore. They are reported to breed in roots and trunks of Eucalyptus species (Myrtaceae). Larvae are root-feeder. Both larvae and adults are present on flowers of Acacia calamifolia (Mimosaceae).

Observations on mating behaviour
The males of this species have the habit to aggregate on and attempting to copulate with discarded brown "stubbies" (a type of beer bottle). The males are apparently attracted by the refraction of light produced by the glass bumps of the bottles, resembling giant females with a very similar colour and surface. Consequently to this behaviour the species is actually threatened. Prof. Darryl Gwynne, from the University of Toronto, and David Rentz were awarded an Ig Nobel Prize for their studies on Julodimorpha species behaviour.  This behaviour is often given as an example of a supernormal stimulus.

Distribution
This species can be found in the arid and semi- arid areas of Queensland, New South Wales, South Australia, Victoria and Western Australia.

References

Further reading
 Biolib
 Australian environment
 Donald D. Homan The Interface Theory of Perception: Natural Selection Drives True Perception To Swift Extinction
 Dr Trevor J. Hawkeswood  Review of the biology and host-plants of the Australian jewel beetle Julodimorpha bakewelli

External links

 Julodimorpha bakewelli and the beer bottles

Buprestidae
Beetles described in 1859